Money-Driven Medicine is a 2009 documentary film that offers a behind-the-scenes look at the American healthcare system. The 86 minute documentary explores the economics underlying, and often undermining, the $2.6 trillion US health care system. Produced by Alex Gibney and inspired by Maggie Mahar's book Money-Driven Medicine: The Real Reason Health Care Costs So Much, Money-Driven Medicine looks at how the United States spends twice as much per capita on healthcare as the average developed nation yet has worse outcomes by explaining that the United States is the only developed nation with a medical system that is largely unregulated and for profit. Money-Driven Medicine includes interviews of experts including Don Berwick, Administrator of the Centers for Medicare and Medicaid Services and former President and Chief Executive Officer of the Institute for Healthcare Improvement; James Weinstein of The Dartmouth Institute for Health Policy and Clinical Practice and bio-ethicist Larry Churchill of Vanderbilt University.

References

External links
 Official site
 California Newsreel
 
 The Costs Of Health Care, Political And Financial (NPR's Fresh Air, July 27, 2009)
 Money-Driven Medicine (Moyer's Journal, September 4, 2009)

Documentary films about health care
2009 films
2009 documentary films
Documentary films about the United States
Healthcare reform in the United States
2000s English-language films